Patrick Joseph McGoldrick (12 August 1865 – 26 April 1939) was an Irish politician. He was elected unopposed as a Sinn Féin Teachta Dála (TD) to the Second Dáil at the 1921 elections for the Donegal constituency. He supported the Anglo-Irish Treaty and voted in favour of it. He was elected unopposed as a pro-Treaty Sinn Féin TD at the 1922 general election. 

He was elected as a Cumann na nGaedheal TD at the 1923 general election. He lost his seat at the June 1927 general election, and was also an unsuccessful candidate at the September 1927 general election.

References

1865 births
1939 deaths
Early Sinn Féin TDs
Cumann na nGaedheal TDs
Members of the 2nd Dáil
Members of the 3rd Dáil
Members of the 4th Dáil
Politicians from County Donegal
People of the Irish Civil War (Pro-Treaty side)